Chondrostoma regium, sometimes known as the  brond-snout or Mesopotamian nase is a species of ray-finned fish in the genus Chondrostoma from Mesopotamia.

References 

 

Chondrostoma
Fish described in 1843